I'm Yours is the fifth studio album by American country music artist Linda Davis. Her only album for DreamWorks Records, it was released in 1998. The album comprises five new songs and nine previously released songs. Of its new recordings, the title track and "From the Inside Out" were all released as singles, charting on the Billboard country charts between 1998 and early 1999.

Content
Seven of the album's songs are the original recordings of songs from Davis's older albums. Chronologically, these songs are "Three Way Tie" (from In a Different Light, 1991); "Company Time," "Love Didn't Do It," and "In Pictures" (from Shoot for the Moon, 1994); "Some Things Are Meant to Be," "A Love Story in the Making," and "What Do I Know" (from Some Things Are Meant to Be, 1996). All of these were singles for Davis, except for "In Pictures" and "What Do I Know", which were both singles for other artists: the former by Alabama from its 1995 album of the same name, and the latter by Ricochet from its 1996 self-titled debut. "I Wanna Remember This" was included on the soundtrack to the 1998 film Black Dog and "Make It Through", a duet with Randy Travis, was included on the soundtrack to the 1998 film The Prince of Egypt.

Of the five new tracks, two charted on the Billboard country charts between late 1998 and early 1999. The first to do so was the title track at number 38 and "From the Inside Out" at number 60.

Track listing

Personnel
As listed in liner notes.

Charlie Anderson – bass guitar
Michael Black – background vocals
Mike Brignardello – bass guitar
Mark Casstevens – acoustic guitar, mandolin
Joe Chemay – bass guitar
Terry Crisp – steel guitar, Dobro
Linda Davis – lead vocals, background vocals
Jerry Douglas – Dobro
Stuart Duncan – fiddle, mandolin
Skip Ewing – acoustic guitar
Molly Felder – background vocals
Larry Franklin – fiddle, mandolin
Paul Franklin – steel guitar
Steve Gibson – electric guitar
Vicki Hampton – background vocals
Scotty Hawkins – drums
Aubrey Haynie – fiddle, mandolin
John Hobbs – piano, organ
Paul Hollowell – piano, organ
Dann Huff – electric guitar
John Barlow Jarvis – piano, organ
Michael Landau – electric guitar
Paul Leim – drums
Chris Leuzinger – electric guitar
Rick Marotta – drums
Brent Mason – electric guitar
Mac McAnally – background vocals
Terry McMillan – percussion
Michael Mellet – background vocals
Steve Nathan – piano, organ
Don Potter – acoustic guitar
Gary Prim – piano, organ
John Robinson – drums
Chris Rodriguez – background vocals
John Wesley Ryles – background vocals
Lang Scott – background vocals
Randy Scruggs – acoustic guitar
Lisa Silver – background vocals
Doug Sizemore – piano, organ
Neil Steubenhaus – bass guitar
Harry Stinson – background vocals
Biff Watson – acoustic guitar
Kent Wells – electric guitar, acoustic guitar
Lonnie Wilson – drums

Strings arranged and conducted by Steve Dorff.

Production
Jimmy Bowen and Linda Davis – track 7
Byron Gallimore, James Stroud and Randy Travis – track 14
John Guess – track 3, 5, 9, 11-13
Julian King and James Stroud – tracks 1, 2, 4, 8, 10
Wally Wilson and James Stroud – track 6

Chart performance

References

Linda Davis albums
1998 compilation albums
DreamWorks Records compilation albums